Method to the Madness of Jerry Lewis is a 2011 American documentary of actor Jerry Lewis. It was released on Encore on December 17, 2011.

Plot
A chronological view of Jerry Lewis' career beginning with his 10-year partnership with Dean Martin to his career as a producer, director, writer, and actor. Archival clips, interviews with friends and family, as well as Lewis himself are included.

Cast

Jerry Lewis
Alec Baldwin
Richard Belzer
Carol Burnett
Chevy Chase
Billy Crystal
Woody Harrelson
John Landis
Richard Lewis
Eddie Murphy
Carl Reiner
Jerry Seinfeld
Steven Spielberg
Quentin Tarantino

Reception
The film holds a 67% rating based on 12 critical reviews at Rotten Tomatoes.

The Washington Post said of the film, "The old clips are still a hoot, but there’s a limit to how much compressed air a viewer can take, listening to a bunch of old men talk about how funny their friend was."  The New York Times review stated, "...by the end of this documentary, yes, you’re convinced that Mr. Lewis was a much larger figure than is generally acknowledged. But you still don’t feel as if you know him."

Home media
The film was released on DVD on January 22, 2013.

References

External links 
 
 Method to the Madness of Jerry Lewis at Rotten Tomatoes

2011 films
Films produced by Jerry Lewis
Jerry Lewis
2010s English-language films
American biographical films
American documentary television films
2011 documentary films
2010s American films